HD 182893, also known as HR 7388 or rarely 60 G. Telescopii, is a solitary, yellowish-orange hued star located in the southern constellation Telescopium. It has an apparent magnitude of 6.13, making it barely visible to the naked eye even under ideal conditions. Based on Gaia DR3 parallax measurements, the object is estimated to be 328 light years away. At its current distance, HD 182893's brightness is diminished by 0.19 magnitudes due to interstellar dust. It has an absolute magnitude of +1.23.

HD 182893 has a stellar classification of K0/1 III, indicating that it is an evolved K-type star with the characteristics of a K0 and K1 giant star. It has 2.42 times the mass of the Sun but at the age of 761 million years, it has expanded to 8.08 times the radius of the Sun. HD 182893 is particularly metal enriched with an iron abundance 145% that of the Sun's ([Fe/H] = +0.16).

References

K-type giants
High-proper-motion stars
Telescopium (constellation)
Telescopii, 60
CD-55 08180
182893
095866
7388